Elections to Scarborough Borough Council were held on 5 May 2011.  The whole council was up for election.

Election result

|}

Ward results

References

External links
Scarborough Council election candidates

2011
2011 English local elections
2010s in North Yorkshire